The Homes for Heroes Act of 2013 is a bill that was introduced into the United States House of Representatives in the 113th United States Congress on January 23, 2013.  The bill would create a Special Assistant for Veterans Affairs in the Department of Housing and Urban Development (HUD) with responsibilities related to making sure United States military veterans get fair access to housing and homeless assistant programs.

Background
A previous, similar version of this bill was introduced in the 112th United States Congress and passed the House, but failed to pass in the Senate.

Provisions/Elements of the bill
This summary is based largely on the summary provided by the Congressional Research Service, a public domain source. 

The Homes for Heroes Act of 2013 would amend the Department of Housing and Urban Development Act  to establish in the Department of Housing and Urban Development (HUD) a Special Assistant for Veterans Affairs.  The Special Assistant for Veterans Affairs would be responsible for ensuring veterans fair access to HUD housing and homeless assistance programs, coordinating all HUD programs and activities relating to veterans, and serving as a HUD liaison with the Department of Veterans Affairs (VA).

Finally, the Homes for Heroes Act of 2013 directs the Secretaries of HUD and VA to report annually to Congress about veteran homelessness and housing assistance.

Procedural history

House
Rep. Al Green (D-TX) introduced the Homes for Heroes Act of 2013 on January 23, 2013.  It was then referred to the United States House Committee on Financial Services.  As of May 13, 2013, the bill has 18 co-sponsors, 16 Democrats and 2 Republicans. 

The House Majority Leader Eric Cantor announced on Friday May 10, 2013 that H.R. 1580 would be considered the following week.

Debate and discussion

See also
Department of Housing and Urban Development (HUD)
Department of Veterans Affairs (VA)
Homeless veterans in the United States

Notes/References

External links

Library of Congress - Thomas H.R. 384
beta.congress.gov H.R. 384
GovTrack.us H.R. 384
OpenCongress.org H.R. 384
WashingtonWatch.com H.R. 384
Press Release from Rep. Green's office on the introduction of H.R. 384

Proposed legislation of the 113th United States Congress
Homelessness and law
Homelessness in the United States
United States Department of Veterans Affairs
United States Department of Housing and Urban Development
Public housing in the United States